Luiz Alberto Leite Sousa (born 2 November 1982), commonly known as Luiz Alberto, is a Brazilian footballer who plays as a defender for Maria da Fonte.

Club career
In the 2014–15 season he helped the Vila Nova de Famalicão side in achieving the promotion to the Segunda Liga.

Honours

Club
Famalicão
Campeonato Nacional de Seniores: Runner-up 2014–15

References

External links

1982 births
Footballers from São Paulo
Living people
Brazilian footballers
Association football defenders
Brazilian expatriate footballers
Expatriate footballers in Portugal
Brazilian expatriate sportspeople in Portugal
G.D. Ribeirão players
G.D. Estoril Praia players
Liga Portugal 2 players
C.F. Os Belenenses players
G.D. Chaves players
C.D. Trofense players
F.C. Famalicão players
Merelinense F.C. players
S.C. Freamunde players